Khosrowabad (also Romanized as Khosrowābād; also known as Kalāteh Khusrābād) is a village in Arabkhaneh Rural District, Shusef District, Nehbandan County, South Khorasan Province, Iran. At the 2006 census, its population was 98, in 29 families.

References 

Populated places in Nehbandan County